The 1905 Montana Agricultural football team was an American football team that represented the Agricultural College of the State of Montana (later renamed Montana State University) during the 1905 college football season. In its second non-consecutive season under head coach A. G. Harbaugh, the team compiled a 1–2–1 record and was outscored by a total of 98 to 45. The 1905 team was the first in program to play opponents from outside Montana, facing teams from the University of Idaho, Washington State College, and Utah Agricultural College. Clinton Wylie was the team captain.

Schedule

References

Montana Agricultural
Montana State Bobcats football seasons
Montana Agricultural football